Aphotic is the eighth studio album by the heavy metal band Novembers Doom. It was released in 2011 on The End Records. The album has a more progressive death metal feel to it than the band's standard death-doom sound.

Track listing

Personnel
 Paul Kuhr - vocals, photography
 Mike Feldman - bass
 Vito Marchese - guitars
 Larry Roberts - guitars, vocals
 Sasha Horn - drums

Additional personnel and staff
 Ben Johnson - keyboards
 Rachel Barton Pine - violin on "What Could Have Been" and "The Dark Host"
 Dan Swanö - vocals on "Of Age and Origin", mastering, mixing
 Anneke van Giersbergen - vocals on "What Could Have Been"
 Raymond Boykin - photography
 Jason Hicks - artwork (interior)
 Tommy Genest - artwork (cover)
 Chris Wisco - engineering, editing

References 

2011 albums
Novembers Doom albums
The End Records albums